Wild Papa is a 1925 American silent comedy film featuring Oliver Hardy.

Cast
 Frank Butler as Tewksbury Spat
 Katherine Grant as The model
 Laura Roessing as Mrs. Tewksbury
 Sidney D'Albrook as Ambrose
 George Rowe
 Jules Mendel
 Oliver Hardy as The model's brother (as Babe Hardy)

See also
 List of American films of 1925
 Oliver Hardy filmography

External links

1925 comedy films
1925 short films
1925 films
American black-and-white films
Silent American comedy films
American silent short films
American comedy short films
1920s American films